Narowal is a city in Punjab, Pakistan.

Narowal or Nurowal may refer to:
Narowal District, a district of Punjab (Pakistan)
Narowal Tehsil, a tehsil of district Narowal
Narowal Junction railway station, railway station in Pakistan
Nurowal, a village in India
Narawala, a village in Sri Lanka

See also
 Narwal (disambiguation)